Nude With Dressing Gown is a 1967 painting by Australian artist John Brack. The painting depicts a nude woman putting on a dressing gown. Unusually for a Brack nude, the painting is a not a formal sitting; instead the subject is "caught ... in a more private moment as she modestly dons a gown".

The work is part of the Joseph Brown Collection at the National Gallery of Victoria.

References

External links
Nude with Dressing Gown - National Gallery of Victoria collection.

Paintings by John Brack
1967 paintings
Paintings in the collection of the National Gallery of Victoria
Nude art